Euseboides matsudai is a species of beetle in the family Cerambycidae. It was described by Gressitt in 1938.

Subspecies
 Euseboides matsudai matsudai Gressitt, 1938
 Euseboides matsudai spinipennis Gressitt, 1940

References

Desmiphorini
Beetles described in 1938